Muhammad I was second independent Shah of Shirvan after death of his father Haytham b. Khalid. Very little information exists about him: "He was ruler of justice and fought against infidels".

References